Agostinia is a genus of beetles in the family Carabidae, containing the following species:

 Agostinia gaudini Jeannel, 1952
 Agostinia gineti Jeannel, 1955
 Agostinia launi Gestro, 1892

References

Trechinae